Response style may refer to:
 The style of responses to questionnaires and surveys. See Response bias
 Psychological responses to stress according to Response Styles Theory. See Rumination (psychology)